The 1987 Svenska Cupen final took place on 29 June 1987 at Råsunda in Solna. The match was contested by the back then second tier Div II teams Kalmar FF and GAIS. GAIS played their first final since 1942 and their second final in total, Kalmar  played their first final since 1981 and their 2nd final in total. Kalmar FF  won their 2nd title with a 2–0 victory.

References

1987
Svenska Cupen
May 1987 sports events in Europe
GAIS matches
Kalmar FF matches